Some Like Them Short is a 1939 collection of short stories by William March.

Contents
 Geraldette
 A Haircut in Toulouse
 The Listening Post
 The Toy Bank
 A Sum in Addition
 The First Dime
 Runagate Niggers
 Senator Upjohn
 A Short History of England
 Tune the Old Cow Died To
 Bill's Eyes
 The Last Meeting
 Nine Prisoners
 Upon the Dull Earth Dwelling
 The Shoe Drummer
 Sweet, Who Was the Armourer's Maid
 A Snowstorm in the Alps
 The Funeral
 A Memorial to the Slain
 Time and Leigh Brothers

1939 short story collections
Short story collections by William March